The 81 class are a class of diesel locomotives built by Clyde Engineering, Kelso for the State Rail Authority.

History
Eighty 81 class locomotives were built by Clyde Engineering, Kelso between September 1982 and February 1986, to replace 1950s vintage 42 and 44 class locomotives as well as provide additional capacity. The first 42 were based at Broadmeadow Locomotive Depot to operate Hunter Valley coal trains, while the remaining 38 were mostly employed on the Main South line between Sydney and Albury, hauling both passenger and freight trains. The final 15 were equipped with V/Line radios and, from July 1986, operated through to Melbourne. The 81 class was an evolution of the Australian National AL class, and the V/Line G class and Australian National BL class were, in turn, developed from the 81 class.

In 1991, a further four units were built at Kelso, using many components from spares held. Following the delivery of the 90 class in 1994, the Broadmeadow-based units were released to replace older locomotives on other freight duties. That saw their sphere of operation extended to Brisbane and Broken Hill.

In the mid-1990s, some of the later locomotives were leased to National Rail. They were later exchanged for 13 of the earlier locomotives which were permanently transferred to National Rail for use around Australia as high-powered shunters. All were reunited when National Rail and FreightCorp were both sold to form Pacific National in February 2002.

In February 1999, 81s began operating in South Australia, when FreightCorp won a contract to haul brown coal on the Leigh Creek to Stirling North line from Leigh Creek to the Northern Power Station in Port Augusta.

, Pacific National operated 83, primarily in New South Wales. 8147 was written off following a derailment and fire near Forbes on 11 March 2007.

Model railways

HO Scale

SDS Models in 2015 announced a range of 81 class locomotives, and was released in early 2022, thought to include Candy (8104, 8136), Bicentennial (8120, 8172), Freightrail and Freightcorp variants (8129, 8139, 8167, 8168, 8172, 8175 and 8177), National Rail (8117) and Pacific National (8120, 8150) models, with all four body types. The range will be available both as DC and DCC with sound. 

Austrains in 2014 released models of the 81 class locomotive retailing at about $300 per model. The range included 8134, 8155 and 8169 in Freightrail Blue, and 8125, 8150 and 8178 in Pacific National blue and yellow. An incorrectly modelled Candy locomotive was also released. A second run was planned for 2015, but will not go ahead after SDS Models
announced their range

Powerline released models of the 81 class in 1987. At the time the entire fleet was painted in Candy, so that was the only model released. 8175 was a dummy unit; 8115, 8122, 8129, 8138, 8142 and 8157 were released with a single motor, while 8169 and 8175 were released with dual motors. Some twin packs were also released, usually the dummy 8175 with one single-motor unit. 1990 saw a special release of an unnumbered Candy locomotive released with a KB coach. In 1997 the locomotive was rerun, this time in Bicentennial (8120 and 8172), Stealth (8167 and 8175) and Freight Rail (8108, 8181, 8184 single motor and 8177 dual motor). In December 1987 Hobbyco in George Street, Sydney, were retailing the single motor version for $101.95.

Fleet Status

References

Further reading

External links

Clyde Engineering locomotives
Co-Co locomotives
Diesel locomotives of New South Wales
Pacific National diesel locomotives
Railway locomotives introduced in 1982
Standard gauge locomotives of Australia
Diesel-electric locomotives of Australia